Mille Gejl (born 23 September 1999) is a Danish footballer who plays as a midfielder who plays for Damallsvenskan club BK Häcken and the Denmark national team. She has been a great talent from a young age, playing 44 international youth matches.

Career

Gejl started her football career in Varde IF. In 2015, she switched to the bigger league club KoldingQ, with whom she also reached the final of DBU's National Cup tournament in 2018. In August of the same year, she moved to the top club Brøndby IF. With the club, she helped win the Elite division 2018-19 and the cup final again twice. The following year she extended until the summer of 2020.  She made her official debut in the 2018–19 UEFA Champions League with Brøndby, where she also scored 2–2 against the Italian giants Juventus in the round of 16. In the 2020–21 UEFA Champions League Gejl was among the selected penalty takers in the round of 16 final against Vålerenga, which was won by Brøndby. 

She then switched in June 2021 to Swedish BK Häcken in the Damallsvenskan. Here she was also a regular part of the team's line-up in the group stage at the 2021–22 UEFA Champions League.

National team 
In addition to being successful at club level, she appeared several times on several of the youth national teams. She scored several times for the U17 national teams in the qualifiers for the U17 European Championship. She was also selected for the 2018 U19 European Championship in Switzerland, where Denmark historically reached the semi-finals. 

On 21 January 2019, she made her official debut for the senior Danish national team in a friendly match against Finland in Larnaca, Cyprus. In this match, she scored her first national team goal. 

She appeared several times in the qualification for the European Championship in England 2022, the World Cup qualification and the Algarve Cup in Portugal.  In the European Championship qualifier against Georgia on 8 October 2019, Mille Gejl scored Denmark's first goal, but later had to leave with an injury. In June 2022, she was selected for the first time for the final squad at the European Football Championship 2022 in England.

Ahead of the European Championship finals in England, Gejl scored the 2–1 goal, four minutes into extra time in the historic record match against Brazil. Gejl had a chorus dedicated to her, in the official EC song for the national team, with the stanza: "You need to Gejl out".

Achievements 

 Damallsvenskan:
 Gold: 2021
 The Elite Division:
 Gold: 2019
 Silver: 2020
 Sydbank Kvindepokalen:
 Finalist: 2019, 2021

References

External links
 
 
 

1999 births
Living people
Danish women's footballers
Denmark women's international footballers
Women's association football midfielders
Brøndby IF (women) players
BK Häcken FF players
UEFA Women's Euro 2022 players

Denmark international footballers
Association football midfielders
Denmark women's youth international footballers